Oil City is an unincorporated community in Kern County, California, about  northeast of Bakersfield, adjacent to the Kern River Oil Field.

The town was named for Oil City, Pennsylvania.

References

Unincorporated communities in Kern County, California
Unincorporated communities in California